Jennifer Carnahan (born 1976) is an American politician who served as the chair of the Republican Party of Minnesota from 2017 to 2021. On March 14, 2022, she declared her candidacy for a special election in Minnesota's 1st congressional district. She finished third in the Republican primary, garnering 8% of the vote.

Early life and education
Carnahan was left on the back doorstep of a rural hospital in South Korea. She was adopted by an American and was raised in the Minneapolis–Saint Paul metropolitan area. She graduated from Osseo Senior High School in 1995.

Carnahan earned her Bachelor of Science degree in 1999 from the S. I. Newhouse School of Public Communications at Syracuse University, where she majored in broadcast journalism. She earned her Masters of Business Administration from the Carlson School of Management at the University of Minnesota in 2010.

Career

Carnahan began her career working with private businesses on branding, including with McDonald's, General Mills, and Ecolab. While at Ecolab, she founded the Ecolab Asian Employee network. She was awarded the General Manager's Award for two consecutive years in 2011 and 2012.

She was elected as a national delegate to the 2016 Republican National Convention in Cleveland, Ohio. In 2016, she was a Republican candidate for the 59th district in the Minnesota Senate, but was defeated by incumbent Democrat Bobby Joe Champion.

Minnesota Republican Party 
Carnahan was elected as chair of the Republican Party of Minnesota in 2017. Under the motto "Make Minnesota Red 2018", the state party hoped to carry the momentum of Trump almost winning Minnesota in 2016, however, the party did not do well in those elections. After the 2020 elections, she alleged that the election results showed "extreme abnormalities and statistical variations from Minnesota's historic voter trends." A reporter for Minnesota Public Radio examined the results and declared that his analysis of the data did not support her opinion.

In January 2017, during her first race for chair, she was quoted to say, "I don’t feel it’s a one-size-fits-all approach. What resonates with voters in different parts of Minnesota may be different even though we have the same set of values. We can’t keep putting up the same white 60-year-old guy to speak about our values, if they say that's identity politics then that's too bad."  

In June 2018, she said that she had faced racist remarks from members of both the Democratic and Republican parties. She also faced criticism after she received a merit bonus based on her performance as a fundraiser. The party executive director, Matthew Pagano, stated, "It's merit-based, based on performance. It's not like a flat salary, which has been a lot larger at a flat rate for prior chairs. The incentive is meant to recognize the extra work involved in securing those large donations, which is the primary duty of any party chair."

Re-election 
On April 10, 2021, Carnahan was re-elected to the chair of the Republican Party of Minnesota. State Senator Mark Koran challenged Carnahan in the race, but she prevailed with 67% of the vote. During her re-election campaign, Carnahan touted the state party's success of winning Minnesota's 1st and 8th districts in 2018 and Minnesota's 7th district in 2020. During that campaign, Carnahan's opponent alleged that the staff of the Minnesota Republican Party seized undue control of the party convention process at the local level in order to tilt the scales in Carnahan's favor.

Resignation 
In August 2021, a federal grand jury indicted Anton Lazzaro, a prominent Republican political operative and fundraiser in Minnesota, on child sex trafficking charges. Lazzaro led a team that helped Carnahan successfully campaign for the state party chair position starting in 2017. Lazzaro was also co-host of the Minnesota Republican Party podcast, Truth Matters, alongside Carnahan. Prior to his indictment for child sex trafficking, Carnahan described Lazzaro as "one of the biggest advocates and champions in the Republican Party of Minnesota." In a statement released to the media after Lazzaro's federal indictment, Carnahan condemned his alleged actions and pledged to donate funds received from him to charity. 

Carnahan ultimately resigned as party chair on August 19, 2021.

2022 congressional special election 

Following the death of her late husband, Jim Hagedorn, Carnahan announced her candidacy in the special election to fill her husband's empty seat in Minnesota's 1st congressional district on March 16, 2022. She was interviewed on Fox News and explained why she was running for her late husband's seat, stating "In the final weeks before his passing, Jim told me to keep forging ahead, to keep reaching my dreams, and to win this seat," Carnahan added. "Jim was my best friend and the love of my life, and it is his blessing that strengthens me for the challenges ahead. I am committed to continuing my husband’s legacy of fighting to secure the border, defending conservative values, safeguarding the integrity of our elections, and serving the people of Minnesota’s First Congressional District."

Personal life 
Carnahan serves on the board of directors for Big Brothers Big Sisters of the Twin Cities and owns a women's specialty boutique. She is a former board member for the Minnesota chapter of the National Association of Asian MBAs, where she led initiatives to support the advancement, development, progression, and advancement of Asian Americans within the corporate world.

Carnahan was criticized in 2020 after a staffer in her husband's Washington, D.C. office e-mailed a National Park Service official at Carnahan's request to ask that Carnahan receive free entrance and private guided tours at several parks in Arizona.

References

1976 births
21st-century American politicians
21st-century American women politicians
American adoptees
American women of Korean descent in politics
Asian-American people in Minnesota politics
Candidates in the 2022 United States House of Representatives elections
Carlson School of Management alumni
Living people
Minnesota Democrats
Minnesota Republicans
S.I. Newhouse School of Public Communications alumni
Spouses of Minnesota politicians
State political party chairs of Minnesota
Women in Minnesota politics
Asian conservatism in the United States